The Sherpa Fire was a wildfire that burned in the Santa Ynez Mountains along the Gaviota Coast in the southwestern part of Santa Barbara County, California in June 2016. The wildfire resulted in evacuations at two state beach campgrounds and some residences together with intermittent interruption of traffic on a state transportation route.

Events
The fire was first reported shortly before 4:00pm on Wednesday June 15, 2016 in the Los Padres National Forest in an area that includes private inholdings. These contrasted with the typical onshore flow so the fire alternated directions between day and night as it continued to spread. As the fire grew, evacuations were ordered for El Capitán State Beach,  Refugio State Beach and residences in El Capitán Canyon. Both a Red Cross evacuation shelter and a livestock evacuation center were established as the fire was burning in an area with a number of large ranches. As the fire ran down the slope, it forced the intermittent closure of the coastal highway designated as U.S. Route 101 and California State Route 1 along with regional and interstate passenger trains and freight service on the adjacent rail line. The fire grew to  overnight and destroyed the water system for El Capitán State Beach.

By Thursday morning, the smoke was visible as far south as South Bay, Los Angeles as well as in Antelope Valley prompting the Los Angeles Fire Department to issue a statement regarding multiple 9-1-1 calls being received for the smell of smoke. On the evening of Thursday 16, the sundowner winds resurfaced and once again forced the closure of the 101.

On Friday morning, the Santa Barbara County office of emergency services declared a state of emergency for the region. Additionally a Red flag warning was issued for the region effective through Saturday at 6:00am. While firefighters battled the fire into the weekend, they were aided by weather changes which included reduced winds and higher humidities as the red flag conditions never truly emerged.

On June 27, officials announced that the estimated containment date had been delayed until July 7. According to a Forest Service Spokesman, the final 7% of the perimeter was in extremely rough terrain that was close to impossible for hand crews or bulldozers to reach. Due to the difficulty of access the fire remained only 96% contained on July 9 and the estimated containment date was pushed back to July 21. Due to favorable conditions, on July 12, the Sherpa fire was 100% contained ahead of schedule. Because of the threat of flare ups within the burn area, patrols continued for several days.

Effects

At the peak of the fire, nearly 2,000 firefighters were assigned to the incident. Approximately 19 residents lost power as Southern California Edison was forced to shut down transmission lines that passed through the fire ground.

More than a week after the fire broke out, Refugio State Beach reopened to visitors on June 26. While no specific monetary assessment was made public, owners of the general store that services campers in the campground said they "lost a lot of business during the time the campground was closed."

Following the fire, the El Capitán State Beach Campground was expected to remain closed for weeks. The campground itself was not damaged but a water treatment plant that services the campground sustained major damage.

Air quality advisories were put into effect on June 17 as haze and falling ash were visible in Los Angeles County. The Santa Barbara County AIr Pollution Control District released a statement that said, in part, that while winds are dispersing some of the smoke, there are still pockets of poor air quality as a result of smoky conditions.

Name

The fire, which started on La Scherpa Ranch, had its name misspelled in the first written dispatches of the incident. While intended to be named after the ranch on which the fire started, the 'c' in Scherpa was omitted. According to a spokesman with the United States Forest Service, "once the name of a fire is entered into the national fire reporting and naming system, it can't be changed. Doing so would confuse administrators, make the name unsearchable in records, and so on."

See also

2016 California wildfires

References

External links
 California wildfires on the US Forestry Incident Information System  (InciWeb)

2016 California wildfires
Santa Ynez Mountains
Wildfires in Santa Barbara County, California